UN numbers from UN3301 to UN3400 as assigned by the United Nations Committee of Experts on the Transport of Dangerous Goods are as follows:


UN 3301 to UN 3400

See also 
Lists of UN numbers

References

External links
ADR Dangerous Goods, cited on 7 May 2015.
UN Dangerous Goods List from 2015, cited on 7 May 2015.
UN Dangerous Goods List from 2013, cited on 7 May 2015.

Lists of UN numbers